Qualified School Construction Bond (QSCB) are a U.S. debt instrument created by Section 1521 of the American Recovery and Reinvestment Act of 2009. Section 54F of the Internal Revenue code covers QSCBs.  QSCBs allow schools to borrow at a nominal zero percent rate for the rehabilitation, repair and equipping of schools.  In addition, QSCB funds can be used to purchase land on which a public school will be built.  Depending on the type of payment elected for the QSCB, tax credit or direct pay, the QSCB lender either receives a Federal tax credit in lieu of receiving an interest payment or, for direct pay QSCBs, a direct interest payment from the Federal government.  The QSCB rate is set by the IRS each day. The rate paid by treasury on issued bonds is fixed based on the published rate at the time of issue. However, the direct payments are currently subject to a discount on the published rate of payment as a result of the automatic spending cuts required by the 2011 Budget Control Act, P.L. 112-25. The IRS publishes the discount rate applied to QSCB direct pay bonds annually, as of October 2104 it increased to 7.3% (prior year rate was 7.2%).

The annual allocation of $11,000,000,000 has been approved for 2009 and 2010 resulting in a total of $22,000,000,000 in QSCB authority.  The US Treasury and the IRS allocate the authority to issue QSCBs to all fifty states and US possessions.  60% is allocated to the fifty states and US possessions and 40% is allocated among "large local educational agencies." Some states have provided QSCB allocation to charter schools. Only the allocations for 2009 have been released by the IRS in Notice 2009-35 was published in the Internal Revenue Bulletin 2009-17 on April 27, 2009.

Funds can be used for renovation and rehabilitation projects, as well as equipment purchases, although conservative advice is to avoid use for furniture purchases. QSCBs may also be used for new building construction and land acquisition. They cannot be applied to building acquisition. All state and local laws applicable to bonds also apply to QSCBs, including Section 148 of the IRS Code. All tax credit bonds covered by Section 54 of the Internal Revenue Code. Section 54A provides general guidance for tax credit bonds and was established by Section 15316 of the Food, Conservation and Energy Act of 2008 (Public Law 110-246). Subsequent sections cover specific tax credit bonds and these sections were established as part of the Emergency Economic Stabilization Act of 2008.

54B Qualified Forestry Conservation Bonds
54C Clean Renewable Bonds
54D Qualified Energy Conservation Bonds
54E Qualified Zone Academy Bonds
54F Qualified School Construction Bonds

References

External links
 American Recovery and Reinvestment Act of 2009 (Public Law 111-5) U.S. Government Printing Office website
 Food, Conservation and Energy Act of 2008 (Public Law 110-246) U.S. Government Printing Office website
 Emergency Economic Statilization Act of 2008 (Public Law 110-343) U.S. Government Printing Office website
IRS Notice of QSCB Allocations U.S. IRS website
QSCB Allocations for 2009 and QZAB Allocations for 2009 and 2010

Education in the United States
Finance in the United States